Copelatus ambiguus is a species of diving beetle. It is part of the genus Copelatus in the subfamily Copelatinae of the family Dytiscidae. It was described by Bertrand & Legros in 1975.

References

ambiguus
Beetles described in 1975